A steeple is a tall tower on a building, often topped by a spire.

Steeple  may also refer to:

Types of steeple 
 Comtois steeple, a church bell tower with Imperial dome, typical of Franche-Comté, France
 Crown steeple, a form of church steeple in which curved stone flying buttresses form the open shape of a rounded crown
 Trinitarian steeple, a 3-point steeple typical of the province of Soule of Basque Country in France

Places

Placenames consisting of "Steeple" 
 Steeple, County Antrim, a townland in Antrim, County Antrim, Northern Ireland
 Steeple, Dorset, a hamlet in south Dorset, England
 Steeple, Essex, a very small village in south Essex, England
 Steeple (Lake District), a fell in the Lake District, England
 The Steeple, a rocky ridge forming the northwest arm of Mount Carroll, Antarctica
 The Steeple (Lochgoilhead), a small mountain near the village of Lochgoilhead, Loch Lomond and the Trossachs National Park, Scotland

Placenames containing "Steeple" 
 Ainderby Steeple, a village and civil parish in the Hambleton district of North Yorkshire, England
 Falkirk Steeple, a landmark which dominates the skyline of Falkirk, central Scotland
 Gwern-y-Steeple, a hamlet in the Vale of Glamorgan, Wales
 Steeple Ashton, a village and civil parish in Wiltshire, England
 Steeple Aston, a village and civil parish in Oxfordshire, England
 Steeple Barton, a civil parish and scattered settlement on the River Dorn in West Oxfordshire, England
 Steeple Bumpstead, a village and civil parish near Haverhill, in Braintree district, Essex
 Steeple Church, the western part of the historic "City Churches" building in Dundee, Scotland
 Steeple Claydon, a village and civil parish in Buckinghamshire, England
 Steeple Gidding, a hamlet near the village of Hamerton, Cambridgeshire, England
 St Andrew's Church, Steeple Gidding, a redundant but preserved Anglican church
 Steeple Jason Island, a small island in the Falkland Islands
 Steeple Langford, a village and civil parish on the River Wylye in Wiltshire, England
 Steeple Langford Down, a Site of Special Scientific Interest
 Steeple Morden, a village and civil parish in Cambridgeshire, England
 RAF Steeple Morden, a former Royal Air Force station
 Steeple Peaks, a group of five summits in Antarctica
 Steeple Point, a low ice-covered point on the west coast of Palmer Land, Antarctica
 Steeple Point to Marsland Mouth, a Site of Special Scientific Interest in Cornwall, England
 Steeple Rock, the largest rock of Barrett Reef by the entrance to Wellington Harbour, New Zealand
 Steeple View, an area of Basildon, Essex, England
 Sturton le Steeple, a village in Nottinghamshire, England
 St Peter and St Paul's Church, Sturton-le-Steeple, a Grade II* listed Anglican parish church

People 
Steeples is a surname of English origin. People with that surname include:
 Albert Steeples (18701945), English cricketer
 Dick Steeples, (18731946), English cricketer
 Eddie Steeples (born 1973), American actor
 John Steeples (1959–2019), English footballer
 Robert Steeples (born 1989), American football player and coach

Other uses 
 STEEPLE, an extended form of PEST analysis (business environment analysis)
 Steeple compound engine, a form of tandem compound steam engine whose name derives from its great height
 Steeple Grange Light Railway, a heritage railway at Wirksworth, Derbyshire, England
 Steeple sign, a radiologic sign found on a frontal neck radiograph, often diagnostic of croup
 Steeple, a 2010 album by British psychedelic rock band Wolf People

See also 
 Haystacks and Steeples, a 1916 American silent comedy film directed by Clarence G. Badger
 How Steeple Sinderby Wanderers Won the F.A. Cup, a 1975 novel by J. L. Carr
 Neon Steeple, the 2014 debut studio album by Christian musician Crowder
 North Adams SteepleCats, a collegiate summer baseball team based in North Adams, Massachusetts
 Silent Steeples, a 1996 album by American indie/roots folk band Dispatch
 Steeplechase (disambiguation)